Jimmy Allen Oliver (born July 12, 1969) is an American former professional basketball player who played several seasons in the National Basketball Association (NBA). He was selected by the Cleveland Cavaliers in the second round (39th pick overall) of the 1991 NBA draft.

College career

Jimmy "Slice" Oliver attended Community College for one year and then transferred to Purdue University, located in West Lafayette, Indiana and played under head coach Gene Keady. The 6'6", 208 lb guard-forward appeared in 31 games in his sophomore season, playing behind Center Steve Scheffler and alongside guard Matt Painter. He averaged 5.3 points while averaging 18.2 minutes per game in his first eligible season.

Jimmy started his junior season out receiving more minutes and improved his shooting percentage to nearly 50%, while also improving his points average to 8 a game. He helped lead the Boilers to a 2nd-place finish in the Big Ten Conference and to the Second Round of the NCAA Tournament with a 22-8 record.

Averaging 19.2 points a game during his senior year, fourth in the conference, and owning an .861 free throw percentage to lead the conference, he was an All-Big Ten First Team selection. Jimmy led Purdue to a second straight NCAA Tournament appearance. He finished his college career with a 40.6% accuracy from 3-point land. Jimmy led the Boilers in assists (89) and minutes per game (35.4) in his senior season. He played his last collegiate game in the NABC All-America Game at the 1991 NCAA Final Four, where he recorded a game-high 25 points.

Professional career

Oliver was selected in the second round with the 39th pick by the Cleveland Cavaliers in the 1991 NBA draft. Oliver played his rookie season for the Cavaliers, averaging 3.6 ppg in 27 games. After being invited to the Detroit Pistons' pre-season camp, he joined the CBA for the 1992–93 season, where he averaged 17.3 ppg in 15 games. After one season in the CBA, Oliver returned to the NBA for the 1993–1994 season. He played for the Boston Celtics, where he averaged 4.9 ppg and started six of the 44 games he played. After leaving the league for two seasons, he returned for the expansion draft, where he played a season with the Toronto Raptors for the 1996–97 season. He finished his last two NBA seasons with the Washington Bullets (1997–98) and the Phoenix Suns (1998–99). Playing on five different NBA teams throughout five seasons, he played in a total of 78 games (14 starts) and scored 331 points with 34% three point and .772% free throw accuracy.

After his NBA tenure, Jimmy Oliver played for several European clubs, including the Greek club Maroussi Athens; he won the FIBA Saporta Cup with them in 2001. He scored 31 points in the final match against Chalon.

Earlier, he had won the 1993 Copa Galicia, with Pescanova Ferrol, of Spain; in 2006, he led KK Olimpija to both the Slovenian League and Slovenian Cup titles.

National team career

During the NBA lockout, Jimmy played for the US national team in the 1998 FIBA World Championship, teamed up with the likes of another former Boilermaker, Brad Miller. Jimmy Oliver was the leading scorer of Team USA averaging 11.8 points per game, leading them to the bronze medal.

References

External links

NBA Historical Profile
Euroleague.net Profile
FIBA Europe Profile
Italian League Profile 
Spanish League Profile 

1969 births
Living people
1998 FIBA World Championship players
ABA League players
African-American basketball players
American expatriate basketball people in Canada
American expatriate basketball people in Croatia
American expatriate basketball people in France
American expatriate basketball people in Greece
American expatriate basketball people in Italy
American expatriate basketball people in Russia
American expatriate basketball people in Slovenia
American expatriate basketball people in Spain
American men's basketball players
Apollon Patras B.C. players
Basketball players from Arkansas
BC Dynamo Moscow players
Boston Celtics players
Cleveland Cavaliers draft picks
Cleveland Cavaliers players
Irakleio B.C. players
KK Split players
KK Olimpija players
Liga ACB players
Maroussi B.C. players
Mens Sana Basket players
Oklahoma City Cavalry players
People from Conway County, Arkansas
Phoenix Suns players
Purdue Boilermakers men's basketball players
Quad City Thunder players
Rockford Lightning players
San Diego Wildcards players
Shooting guards
Sioux Falls Skyforce (CBA) players
SLUC Nancy Basket players
Small forwards
Toronto Raptors players
United States men's national basketball team players
Washington Wizards players
21st-century African-American people
20th-century African-American sportspeople